Leading Edge Products, Inc., was a computer manufacturer in the 1980s and the 1990s.  It was based in Canton, Massachusetts.

History
Leading Edge was founded in 1980 by Thomas Shane and Michael Shane.  At the outset, they were a PC peripherals company selling aftermarket products such as Elephant Memory Systems brand floppy disk media ("Elephant. Never forgets") and printer ribbons, and acting as the sole North American distributor/reseller of printers from the Japanese manufacturer, C. Itoh, the most memorable being the popular low-end dot-matrix printer, "The Gorilla Banana".   In 1984 the company sold the computer aftermarket product line and sales division to Dennison Computer Supplies, a division of Dennison Manufacturing.  In 1984, they began to use Daewoo parts, and in 1989, they were acquired by Daewoo, as part of their recovery from Chapter 11 bankruptcy. (Shane declared that the costs of a legal dispute with Mitsubishi lead to its bankruptcy). In January 1990, Daewoo hired Al Agbay, a veteran executive from Panasonic to lead the company out of Chapter 11 Bankruptcy.  In the three years that followed, Agbay and his executive team repaid dealers approximately $16 million and increased annual revenues to over $250 million before a contract dispute severed Agbay and Daewoo's relationship. In October, 1995, Daewoo sold the company to Manuhold Investment AG, a Swiss electronics company. Leading Edge had sold 185,000 of its PC clones in the United States in 1994, but in 1995 sales fell from 90,000 in the first half to almost none in the second half. By 1997 the company was defunct.

Products

Hardware
The first known computer to be produced by Leading Edge is the Model M, released in 1982. By 1986 it sold for $1695 (US) with a monitor and two floppy drives. It used an Intel 8088-2 processor, running at a maximum of 7.16 MHz on an 8 bit bus, compared to 6 MHz for the IBM PC-AT on a 16 bit bus. The 'M' stands for Mitsubishi, their parts provider.

They began producing the Leading Edge Model D in June, 1985, when they began to use Daewoo parts. That model was described as "the quality is good and the price is right." It was a Consumer Reports "Best Buy." It was IBM compatible, using the same Intel 8088 16 bit processor as the IBM PC, with two floppy disc drives, 256K of RAM, and an amber monitor. The machine sold for $1495 (US).  They sold 125,000 in the first 13 months, then reduced the price to $1295 (US).

When IBM started supplying 20 MB hard drives as standard for its newer PC-XT's, Leading Edge supplied a 30 meg hard drive standard. They later released a Model D86 (an Intel 8086), Model D2 in 1988 with a 65 MB hard drive for $2495(US) and a 10 MHz processor (an Intel 80286) and Model D3 (an Intel 80386).

In 1993, Leading Edge marketed the WinPro Series of computers. These computers had then an i486 or Intel 80486 processors. The low end model had an i486 SX25 processor—which lacked an FPU. The i486 DX33 Processor had the FPU in. The computers had a 3.5 inch floppy, a 5.25 in floppy, 170MB hard drive, with 4MB of RAM, which could be expanded to 20MB if needed. Windows 3.1 and MS-DOS 5.0 were the operating systems. The cost of a Leading Edge Computer ranged from $1299.99 to $2199.99 during this time.

In 1994, Leading Edge marketed the Wintower 486 Multimedia PC, with 66 MHz processor, 8 MB ram, 340 MB hard drive, 2 floppies, CD ROM,  modem, sound card and monitor for a "street price" of $2600 (US).

Software
One of the programs offered on Leading Edge computers was the Leading Edge Word Processor. It was described as easy to use, created automatic backup copies, and loaded in 256 K of RAM, described as a "large" amount. With the program in memory, both floppy drives were available for storage. It was introduced in 1983, and sold in 1984 for $100. (U.S.) LEWP, as it was called, was a very easy to use word processor that had features that were bred into newer systems later. It automatically fixed transpositions on the run, a feature not seen in more sophisticated contemporary word processing programs.

In 1984, Leading Edge also released an innovative database application called Nutshell (developed by a company called Nashoba Systems and distributed by Leading Edge). Nutshell was an earlier form of a program later released as FileMaker and subsequently FileMaker Pro.

References 

Compute! Issue 86, July 1987. IBM Compatibles - The Universe Expands refers to Leading Edge as a "young and aggressive" company.

External links
 

Daewoo
1980 establishments in Massachusetts
1997 disestablishments in Massachusetts
1989 mergers and acquisitions
American companies established in 1980
American companies disestablished in 1997
Computer companies established in 1980
Computer companies disestablished in 1997
Defunct computer companies based in Massachusetts
Defunct computer companies of the United States
Defunct computer hardware companies
IBM PC compatibles
Manufacturing companies established in 1980
Manufacturing companies disestablished in 1997